The Mudouyu Lighthouse is a lighthouse on Mudou Island, Baisha Township, Penghu County, Taiwan.

History
The lighthouse is the first lighthouse built in Taiwan under Japanese rule.

Architecture
The lighthouse was built with strong cast iron to avoid the strong wind and waves eroding away the building. The exterior of the lighthouse is painted in black and white stripes. It stands 39.9 meters tall, making it the tallest lighthouse in Taiwan.

Energy
The lighthouse has a water collecting facility to collect rainfall from its rooftop. The lighthouse is powered by three generators due to the absence of a power plant on Mudou Island.

See also

 List of lighthouses in Taiwan
 List of tourist attractions in Taiwan

References

External links

 Maritime and Port Bureau MOTC

1902 establishments in Taiwan
Lighthouses completed in 1902
Lighthouses in Penghu County